Eddie Preston (May 9, 1925 – June 22, 2009) was an American jazz trumpeter.

He was born in Dallas, Texas and died in Palm Coast, Florida.

Preston began playing in big bands after World War II, and did stints with Lionel Hampton (1955–56), Ray Charles (1959), Louis Jordan (1960–61), Duke Ellington (1962), and Count Basie (1963). He played with Charles Mingus between 1963 and 1965 and again in 1969–72, with the time in between spent freelancing with musicians such as Sonny Stitt and Frank Foster. He played again with Ellington in 1971 and then did some work as a leader, as well as working with Roland Kirk in 1977 and Archie Shepp in 1979.

Discography

As sideman 
With Duke Ellington
 The London Concert (United Artists, 1972)
 The Afro-Eurasian Eclipse (Fantasy, 1975)
 The Ellington Suites (Pablo, 1976)
 Up in Duke's Workshop (Pablo, 1979)
 Recollections of the Big Band Era (Atlantic, 1982)
 The Private Collection: Volume 4 Studio Sessions New York 1963 (LMR, 1987)
 The Private Collection: Volume 10 Studio Sessions (Saja 1989)
 Never-Before-Released Recordings 1965-1972 (Musicmasters 1991)

With Lionel Hampton
 A Song of the Vineyard/Shalom Shalom (Clef, 1955)
 Lionel Hampton Big Band (Clef, 1955)
 Midnight Sun/Airmail Special (Clef, 1955)

With Charles Mingus
 Mingus Mingus Mingus Mingus Mingus (Impulse!, 1964)
 Charles Mingus Sextet In Berlin (Beppo, 1970)
 Pithycanthropus Erectus (America, 1971)
 Blue Bird (America, 1971)
 Charles Mingus with Orchestra (Columbia, 1971)
 Charles Mingus and Friends in Concert (Columbia, 1973)
 Reincarnation of a Lovebird (Prestige, 1974)
 Charles Mingus: Statements (Joker, 1977)
 Charles Mingus in Paris: The Complete America Session (Sunnyside, 2006)

With others
 Count Basie, This Time by Basie! (Reprise, 1963)
 Sonny Criss, Slim Gaillard, Roy Porter Big Band, Black California (The Savoy Sessions) (Savoy 1976)
 Bill Doggett, The Right Choice (After Hours, 1991)
 Rahsaan Roland Kirk, Boogie-Woogie String Along for Real (Warner Bros. 1978)
 Archie Shepp, Attica Blues Big Band Live at the Palais Des Glaces (Blue Marge, 1979)
 Sonny Stitt, What's New!!! (Roulette, 1966)
 McCoy Tyner, Inner Voices (Milestone, 1978)

References 

American jazz trumpeters
American male trumpeters
1925 births
2009 deaths
Musicians from Dallas
Duke Ellington Orchestra members
People from Palm Coast, Florida
American male jazz musicians
20th-century American male musicians